Russell Johnston (born 10 February 1960) is a former Australian rules footballer who played for  in the Victorian Football League (VFL) and Port Adelaide in the South Australian National Football League (SANFL).

Early years 
Russell was originally from Casterton Football Club in the Western District Football League, Victoria.

Collingwood (1980) 
In 1980 Johnston was recruited by Collingwood. He made his debut in Round 3 of the 1980 VFL season against Hawthorn at Princes Park. At the end of the season Johnston was delisted by Collingwood.

Port Adelaide (1981–1990) 
Johnston joined SANFL club Port Adelaide in 1981. A member of Port's 1981 premiership team, Johnston was appointed club captain in 1986. He missed the 1988 Grand Final win due to suspension but captained Port Adelaide to premierships the next two seasons. Johnston's performance in the 1989 Grand Final earned him a Jack Oatey Medal, to go with the Port Adelaide 'Best and Fairest' which he also won that year.

Johnston represented South Australia in six interstate matches during his career.

Honours 
In 2000 Johnston was named as first ruckman in Port Adelaide's official Greatest Team, which took into account all players since 1870.

References

1960 births
Living people
Australian rules footballers from Victoria (Australia)
Collingwood Football Club players
Port Adelaide Football Club (SANFL) players
Port Adelaide Football Club players (all competitions)
Casterton Football Club players
South Australian State of Origin players
People from Casterton, Victoria